Energhetic Dubăsari was a football club from Dubăsari, Republic of Moldova. It was founded in 1996 and played in the 1999–2000 season of the Moldovan National Division. In 2007 the club was dissolved.

References

External links
 Energhetic Dubăsari at WeltFussballArchive 
 Energhetic Dubăsari at soccerway
 Energhetic Dubăsari at stadia-md.com

Defunct football clubs in Moldova
1996 establishments in Moldova
2007 disestablishments in Moldova
Association football clubs established in 1996
Association football clubs disestablished in 2007
Football clubs in Transnistria